Anti-revisionism is a position within Marxism–Leninism which emerged in the 1950s in opposition to the reforms of Soviet leader Nikita Khrushchev. Where Khrushchev pursued an interpretation that differed from his predecessor Joseph Stalin, the anti-revisionists within the international communist movement remained dedicated to Stalin's ideological legacy and criticized the Soviet Union under Khrushchev and his successors as state capitalist and social imperialist. 

The term Stalinism is also used to describe these positions, but it is often not used by its supporters who opine that Stalin simply synthesized and practiced orthodox Marxism and Leninism. Because different political trends trace the historical roots of revisionism to different eras and leaders, there is significant disagreement today as to what constitutes anti-revisionism.

As a result, modern groups which describe themselves as anti-revisionist fall into several categories. Some uphold the works of Stalin and Mao Zedong and some the works of Stalin while rejecting Mao and universally tend to oppose Trotskyism. Others reject both Stalin and Mao, tracing their ideological roots back to Karl Marx, Friedrich Engels, and Vladimir Lenin. In addition, other groups uphold various less-well-known historical leaders such as Enver Hoxha, who also broke with Mao during the Sino-Albanian split.

Overview 
Marxism–Leninism is a politico-economic theory developed by Joseph Stalin in the 1920s. According to its proponents, it is a synthesis of the theories of Karl Marx, Friedrich Engels and Vladimir Lenin while critics term it Stalinism. It was Stalin who succinctly defined that "Leninism is the Marxism of the era of imperialism and the proletarian revolution" in his famous pamphlet titled Foundations of Leninism, and this tenet forms the basis of Marxism–Leninism. It builds on Marx's theory that capitalism divides society into two classes, namely the bourgeoisie or property-owning class and the proletariat or labouring class. It claims that within the international proletariat emerges a section of labour aristocracy from the powerful imperialist nations, which is granted some economic and political power over the superexploited proletariat of the colonial and neo-colonial countries. Marxists–Leninists advocate the most class conscious members of the proletariat form vanguard parties based around the principle of democratic centralism which will lead revolutionary movements towards the creation of single-party states which will gradually progress to socialism and finally global communism.

Anti-revisionism is a position within Marxism–Leninism based on its interpretation by Stalin, who supported the dictatorship of the proletariat, drastic and fast-paced economic transformation in the short-term, and violent confrontation with capitalist powers. The emergence of the Khrushchevist interpretation lead to a reaction from pro-Stalin Marxist–Leninists, who formed the anti-revisionist movement and opposed Khruscevists de-Stalinization policies. Anti-revisionists rejected the Soviet Union's leadership of the Marxist–Leninist movement, believing it had become state capitalist and social imperialist. Despite this, the lines between the two camps in Marxism–Leninism were often blurry.

The Korean Workers' Party was pro-Soviet, but it also defended Stalin's legacy and was engaged in violent struggle against the capitalist South Korea and its American backers. Due to this, the global anti-revisionist movement tended to support it despite its ideological departure from Marxism–Leninism. The Communist Party of Cuba and the Communist Party of Vietnam also received critical support from many anti-revisionists despite being pro-Soviet due to their violent struggles against the United States. The Cuban communists also provided material support to the American anti-revisionist Black Panther Party.

The Chinese Communist Party is officially anti-revisionist. However, most anti-revisionists followed the example of the Albanian Labour Party in denouncing it as revisionist following the beginning of market-based and pro-American reforms in late 1970s. The term "Dengism" is often used to describe this perceived revisionist tendency in Marxism–Leninism despite official claims that it is an adaptation of Marxism–Leninism to contemporary Chinese material conditions rather than a revision.

Despite agreeing that he had a revisionist turn later in his life, most contemporary anti-revisionists hold particular interest in the theories of Chinese leader Mao Zedong, who claimed that socialist movements in the neo-colonial world could temporarily ally with the nationalist movements of the local petite bourgeoisie and that the implementation of a mass line policy will prevent a vanguard from becoming revisionist. Others believe in a separate ideology known as Marxism–Leninism–Maoism which views the early theories of Mao as a higher stage of Leninist ideology, just like Leninism is considered by its proponents to be a higher stage of Marxism. Among both anti-revisionist Marxist–Leninists with a tendency towards Mao's theories and Marxist–Leninist–Maoists, there exists a Maoist Third Worldist tendency which claims the labour aristocracy has no immediate revolutionary potential and may also claim it experiences no exploitation at all.

History 

Self-proclaimed anti-revisionists firmly oppose the reforms initiated in Marxist–Leninist countries by leaders like Nikita Khrushchev in the Soviet Union and Deng Xiaoping in China. They generally refer to such reforms and states as state capitalist and social imperialist. They also reject Trotskyism and its permanent revolution as hypocritical by arguing that Leon Trotsky had at one time thought it acceptable that socialism could work in a single country as long as that country was industrialized, but that Trotsky had considered Russia too backward to achieve such industrialization which is what it later in fact did achieve, mostly through his archenemy Joseph Stalin's five-year plans.

In their own right, anti-revisionists also acknowledge that the Soviet Union contained a new class or red bourgeoisie, but they generally place the blame for the formation of that class on Khrushchev and his successors and not on Stalin. In anti-revisionist circles, there is very little talk of class conflict in the Soviet Union before 1956, except when talking about specific contexts such as the Russian Civil War (when some agents of the former feudal ruling class tried to retake state power from the Bolsheviks) and World War II (fought principally between communists and fascists, representing the interests of the proletariat and the bourgeoisie, respectively).

During the Sino-Soviet split, the governments of the People's Republic of China under Mao Zedong and the People's Republic of Albania under Enver Hoxha proclaimed themselves to be taking an anti-revisionist line and denounced Khrushchev's policies in the Soviet Union. In the United States, those who supported China or Albania at the time were expelled from the Communist Party USA under orders from Moscow and formed the Progressive Labor Movement and other new communist movement parties in 1961. A short time later, anti-revisionist groups were further divided by the Sino-Albanian split, with those following Albania being loosely described as Hoxhaist.

On the whole, the original 1960s-era anti-revisionists tended to take a careful, selective approach to the Cuban Revolution and the way it soon aligned itself with Soviet ideas and practice, criticizing the latter action while simultaneously acknowledging some aspects of Cuban self-described socialism as genuinely revolutionary—in particular the writing and thinking of Che Guevara. Anti-revisionists also took a hopeful approach towards the Vietnamese communists, expressing confidence that they too were genuinely revolutionary-communist in their aspirations and supported their struggle against the United States in the Vietnam War—a side which got a lot of support from the Soviet Union, anti-revisionists' state capitalist enemy.

Several present-day communist parties worldwide still see themselves as explicitly anti-revisionist, but not every such party adhering to elements of anti-revisionism necessarily adopts the label anti-revisionist. Many such organizations may call themselves Maoist, Marxist–Leninist, or simply revolutionary communist. The Workers' Party of Korea still claims an anti-revisionist political line, but the communist movement as a whole and anti-revisionists from the Maoist and Hoxhaist camps in particular tend to insist North Korea is a revisionist state. However, many if not most Hoxhaists and Maoists are critically supportive of North Korea on grounds of anti-imperialism.

Anti-revisionists aligned with Hoxha and the line of the Party of Labour of Albania argue that Mao Zedong Thought is itself a form of revisionism. Hoxhaists insist that Mao's Three Worlds Theory contradicted Marxism–Leninism and existed only to justify his alliance with the United States that began in the early 1970s and his meeting with President Richard Nixon during the Sino-Soviet split that Hoxha and the Hoxhaists opposed. Hoxhaists also argue that the theory of New Democracy and people's war were revisionist and anti-scientific. The Hoxhaist camp came into existence during the Sino-Albanian split.

Active anti-revisionist groups 

 Afghanistan
 Communist (Maoist) Party of Afghanistan
 Albania
 Communist Party of Albania
 Argentina
 Revolutionary Communist Party of Argentina
 Australia 
 Communist Party of Australia (Marxist–Leninist)
 Benin
 Communist Party of Benin
 Bhutan
 Communist Party of Bhutan (Marxist–Leninist–Maoist)
 Brazil
 Revolutionary Communist Party
 Burkina Faso
 Voltaic Revolutionary Communist Party
 Burma
 Communist Party of Burma
 Canada
 Communist Party of Canada (Marxist–Leninist)
 Parti marxiste–léniniste du Québec
 Chile
 Chilean Communist Party (Proletarian Action)
 China
 Maoist Communist Party of China
 Colombia
 Communist Party of Colombia (Marxist–Leninist)
 Côte d'Ivoire
 Revolutionary Communist Party of Côte d'Ivoire
 Denmark
 Workers' Communist Party
 Dominican Republic
 Communist Party of Labour
 Ecuador
 Marxist–Leninist Communist Party of Ecuador
 France
 Workers' Communist Party of France
 Communist Revolutionary Party of France
 Georgia
 New Communist Party of Georgia
 Germany
 Organization for the Construction of a Communist Workers' Party of Germany (Arbeit Zukunft)
 Marxist–Leninist Party of Germany
 Greece
 Movement for the Reorganization of the Communist Party of Greece 1918–1955
 Marxist–Leninist Communist Party of Greece
 Communist Party of Greece
 Communist Party of Greece (Marxist–Leninist)
 India
Communist Party of India (Marxist–Leninist)
 Communist Party of India (Maoist)
Socialist Unity Centre of India (Communist)
 Iran
 Iranian People's Fedai Guerrillas
 Labour Party of Iran
 Italy
 Mexico
 Communist Party of Mexico (Marxist–Leninist)
 Nepal
 Unified Communist Party of Nepal (Maoist)
 Norway
 Serve the People (Norway)
 Pakistan
 Communist Mazdoor Kissan Party
 Philippines
 Communist Party of the Philippines
 Portugal
 Portuguese Communist Party
 Russia
 VKPB
 Communist Party of the Soviet Union (2001)
 Russian Communist Workers' Party
 Communists of Russia
 Russian Maoist Party
 Spain
 Communist Party of Spain (Marxist–Leninist)
 Marxist–Leninist Party (Communist Reconstruction)
 Syria
 Syrian Communist Party (Bakdash)
 Tunisia
 Tunisian Workers' Communist Party
 Turkey
 Marxist–Leninist Communist Party
 Communist Party of Turkey/Marxist–Leninist
 Revolutionary Communist Party of Turkey (TDKP)
 United Kingdom
 Communist Party of Britain (Marxist–Leninist)
 Stalin Society
 Revolutionary Communist Party of Britain (Marxist–Leninist)
 New Communist Party of Britain
 United States
 American Party of Labor
 Freedom Road Socialist Organization
 Progressive Labor Party
 Workers Party, USA
 Venezuela
 Marxist–Leninist Communist Party of Venezuela

Historical anti-revisionist groups 
 Communist Party of China under Mao Zedong's leadership
 Party of Labour of Albania
 Soviet Revolutionary Communists (Bolsheviks)
 Communist Party of Germany/Marxist-Leninists
 Communist Party of Germany (Roter Morgen)
 Kurdistan Workers' Party (PKK)

References

External links 
 Encyclopedia of Anti-Revisionism On-Line by the Marxists Internet Archive
 Lies Concerning the History of the Soviet Union by the Stalin Society
 List of Anti-Revisionist Parties/Groups by the International Organizations and Conferences of Leftist Parties
 Stand for Socialism Against Modern Revisionism by the Philippine Revolution

 
Hoxhaism
Maoism
Marxism
Marxism–Leninism
Stalinism